"Ma Chérie" is a song by Swiss producer DJ Antoine.

Ma Chérie may also refer to:

"Ma Chérie ~Itoshii Kimi E~", a song by Japanese visual kei band Malice Mizer

See also
Bonne nuit ma chérie, the German entry in the Eurovision Song Contest 1960
My Cherie Amour (disambiguation)